The Volkswagen Talagon is a mid-size crossover SUV with three-row seating manufactured by the German automaker Volkswagen through FAW-Volkswagen joint venture in China since 2021. It is the largest SUV model produced by the company and also the second largest vehicle based on the MQB platform, after the Viloran minivan.

Overview 

The Talagon was previewed by a near-production concept vehicle called the SMV (Sport Multi-Purpose Vehicle) in April 2019. The production version was unveiled at Auto Shanghai in April 2021. The vehicle is based on the modular MQB platform in its most stretched configuration.

Powertrain 
A 2.5-litre VR6 engine labeled as '530 V6' is also offered. All configurations are paired with a wet 7-speed DSG transmission.

References

External links 

Talagon
Cars introduced in 2021
Mid-size sport utility vehicles
Crossover sport utility vehicles
Front-wheel-drive vehicles
All-wheel-drive vehicles